Masoud Al-Rubaie (born 17 December 1995) is a Saudi Arabian professional footballer who plays as a centre-back for Najran.

Personal life
Masoud is the older brother of Al-Ahli goalkeeper Mohammed Al-Rubaie and the cousin of the players Hamad Al-Rabaei, Saeed Al-Rubaie and Abdullah Al-Rubaie.

Career
Al-Rubaie started his career at the youth teams of hometown club Al-Okhdood. He made his debut during the 2015–16 season and was part of the squad that won the 2017–18 Third Division. On 25 October 2020, Al-Rubaie joined Pro League club Al-Batin. He made his debut on 17 February 2021, in the 2–1 league win against Abha. On 23 August 2022, Al-Rubaie joined Najran.

Honours
Al-Okhdood
Saudi Third Division: 2017–18

References

External links
 
 

Living people
1995 births
People from Najran
Association football defenders
Saudi Arabian footballers
Al-Okhdood Club players
Al Batin FC players
Najran SC players
Saudi Fourth Division players
Saudi Second Division players
Saudi Professional League players